Daxata confusa is a species of beetle in the family Cerambycidae. It was described by Francis Polkinghorne Pascoe in 1869. It is known from Malaysia, Borneo and Java.

References

Pteropliini
Beetles described in 1869